Highlands is a middle class, residential suburb in the east of Harare, best known as the home of the Zimbabwe Broadcasting Corporation, and for its ethnic diversity, history, natural environment and splendid panoramic views of downtown Harare. It is often grouped in the inner east suburbs of Harare such as Eastlea, Highlands, Greendale and Milton Park.

History
When farmer, Gerhardt Van der Byl retired back to the Cape Province in 1927, he sold his then farm, Welmoed to the Salisbury Real Estate Co, a property development company with Scottish founders, who settled on the name Highlands, partly because it lies on one of the highest pieces of ground in Harare, but also because of their Scottish heritage. The first road to be paved and developed was called Argyle Drive. Over time, the suburb was subdivided and became a desirable place to live close to the city centre.

Due to its elevation, it has long been one of the more desirable and quieter areas in Harare to live. This part of Harare is generally a well-kept, leafy and compact, area between affluent northeastern areas like Borrowdale, Chisipite and Glen Lorne, and the gritty, workaday city centre. Despite its proximity to the CBD, Highlands has seen less of the development and gentrification than nearby, Eastlea, Milton Park and Greendale, where increasingly houses are being bought and demolished in favor of commercial buildings and apartments due to lack of space in the city, and as such the area has become a popular are for boutique hotels and lodges that offer a refuge for the city centre, while maintaining a disproportionate number of long term residents by city standards.

Within the Ballantyne and Mukuvisi Woodlands boundaries lies one the highest natural point in the Harare, some 1600 metres above sea level. Ballantyne Park also hosts community gardens, playgrounds, tennis courts, playing fields, and dog-walkers year round, while Mukuvisi is a popular nature and wildlife reserve.

Highlands was transformed when television was introduced on 15 November 1960 after ZBC TV, then RTV, opened its television studios on Northend Road in Pockets Hill, Highlands, making it the second country after Nigeria to launch a television service in Africa and the first in Southern Africa.

Geographic impact

The neighborhood is home to one the highest points in Harare, Ballantyne Park, which houses a nature reserve, recreation areas and a mixed use cricket and soccer field. Due to the high altitude, the neighbourhood is best known as the Zimbabwe Broadcasting Corporation, Multichoice Zimbabwe and nearly all of the city's radio masts and towers including the studios and/or towers for ZBC television and radio stations. A government monopoly on local broadcasting has prevented the area from becoming a true media hub in the vein of London's, White City, though there has been talk of allowing more private broadcasters by the Mnangagwa government.

Architecture

Highlands is one of the most architecturally rich areas of Harare, thanks to its founders the, Salisbury Real Estate Company, and most prominently, William D'Arcy Cathcart, a graduate of the Architectural Association of London, before he migrated to Salisbury (Harare) in 1910. Initially working for the Public Works Department, he left the following year to set up his own practice. His first project was a Tobacco Warehouse for the BSAC.

In association with a few friends, he formed the Salisbury Real Estate Company that bought the Welmoed East Farm and developed in the early 1930s into the suburb of Highlands. D'Arcy Cathcart made such a mark architecturally, that he is regarded as one of the leading architects of 20th century Harare. He eschewed the then popular Cape Dutch architecture and designed many buildings and residences that followed the English neoclassical, Georgian and the Arts and Crafts movement styles. His own residence Chaninga House , nestled on a prominent hill in the suburb, and Limbe Lodge best known as Governor's Lodge (now the public Services Training Center) – once home to the Governor-General of Rhodesia and Nyasaland are listed as heritage buildings.

While most buildings and residences from post-World War one Rhodesia were simple pioneer types or Cape Dutch designs, Cathcart's designs of the National Employers Mutual General Assurance Building, and Town house made his firm extremely influential throughout the 1930s–1940s for municipal and government buildings. His practice later opened offices in Mutare, Bulawayo, Ndola and Lusaka. A founder member of the Institute of Southern Rhodesian Architects (now Institute of Architects Zimbabwe) and the chief influence on Highlands' layout and architecture, his legacy continues in his firm, now known as Pearce, McComish & Tarabuku Architects.

Modern Highlands is largely a leafy, residential neighbourhood in the shadow of the ZBC's Pockets Hill studios, composed primarily of single-family detached houses and Edwardian row houses, although Enterprise Road and Kamfinsa Shopping Centre are lined with apartment buildings, townhouses and lodges.

Education

Highlands is the location of several independent schools, including Highlands Junior School, Admiral Tait School and Abbeys Preparatory School. High school students tend to move on to nearby Churchill School in Eastlea, Harare International School or Chisipite Senior School in Chisipite.

Other notable institutions in the area include the Zimbabwe Institute of Management and the Culinary Arts Academy.

The City of Harare Public Library system operates the Highlands Library on Kew Drive, which serves the neighbourhood. Other notable libraries in proximity to Highlands are Harare City Library and the Greendale Public Library in Greendale.

Historic landmarks
There are several historic landmarks in Highlands notably, Ballantyne Park and the better known, Mukuvisi Woodlands, a large, sprawling conservation area features forested green spaces rich with native wildlife and flora. Religious listings include Highlands Presbyterian Church, which reflects the areas Scottish links, Highlands Seventh-day Adventist Church and St Luke's Anglican Church.

There are two educational properties of note for their historical architecture namely, Highlands Junior School and Admiral Tait School.

References

1927 establishments in Southern Rhodesia
Suburbs of Harare